Blasco Giurato (7 June 1941 – 26 December 2022) was an Italian cinematographer.

Born in Rome, Giurato was the brother of journalist Luca Giurato and of singer-songwriter Flavio Giurato. He was nominated to the BAFTA Award for Best Cinematography for Giuseppe Tornatore's Cinema Paradiso. In 1993, he won the Globo d'oro for the cinematography of Tornatore's A Pure Formality. In 1997, he was nominated for the David di Donatello for Best Cinematography for his work in Maurizio Zaccaro's The Game Bag.

Selected filmography 

 La Orca (1976)
 Oedipus Orca (1976)
 A Spiral of Mist (1977)
 Escape from the Bronx (1983)
 Sapore di mare 2 - Un anno dopo (1983)
 Il camorrista (1986)
 Teresa (1987)
 Cinema Paradiso (1988)
 Sinbad of the Seven Seas (1989)
 Time to Kill (1989)
 I'll Be Going Now (1990)
 Everybody's Fine (1990)
 Year of the Gun (1991)
 Amami (1993)
 A Pure Formality (1993)
 Tentazioni Metropolitane (1993)
 Belle al Bar (1994)
 Ivo the Genius (1995)
 Sostiene Pereira (1995)
 The Blue Collar Worker and the Hairdresser in a Whirl of Sex and Politics (1996)
 Albergo Roma (1996)
 The Game Bag (1997)
 Of Lost Love (1998)
 Ferdinando and Carolina (1999)
 Viper (2000)
 Vajont (2001)
 Two Friends (2002)
 Five Moons Square (2003)
 A Golden Boy (2014)

References

External links 
 

1941 births
2022 deaths
Film people from Rome
Italian cinematographers